Darvishan (also Romanized as Darvīshān; also known as Imām-i-Darvīshān) is a village in the Khenejin District of Farahan County, Markazi Province, Iran. At the 2006 census, its population was 384, in 96 families.

References 

Populated places in Komijan County